Daniela Mona Lambin (born 14 February 1991) is an Estonian footballer. She plays as a defender and a midfielder.

Lambin played for the Estonia women's national football team.

References

External links

1991 births
Living people
Estonian women's footballers
Finnish women's footballers
Kansallinen Liiga players
Estonia women's international footballers
Women's association football defenders
Women's association football midfielders
FC Flora (women) players
FC Levadia Tallinn (women) players